The Lithuanian National Defence Volunteer Forces Big Band (Lithuanian: Lietuvos krašto apsaugos savanorių pajėgų bigbendas, KASPB) is a Lithuanian musical group in the Lithuanian Armed Forces. It was founded in 1991 as the first official wind band of the armed forces. Most of the band's members are graduates of the Lithuanian Academy of Music and the Vilnius Conservatory. The 30 musicians of the big band have performed all over the Eurasia region, in countries such as in France, Poland, Italy, Estonia, Latvia, Russia, Belgium and Afghanistan. Captain Ričardas Čiupkovas is the current band leader and director of music of the KASPB.

See also
Lithuanian National Defence Volunteer Forces
Lithuanian Armed Forces Headquarters Band
Lithuanian Air Force Band

References

Lithuanian military bands
Lithuanian musical groups
Musical groups established in 1991
1991 establishments in Lithuania